Hellish Quart is a sword fighting video game by Polish developer Kubold. The game is a 1v1 battle of two sword wielding players who fight until the opposing player is severely injured.

The game resembles the 1997 game Bushido Blade in concept, a concept that hadn't been repeated since Bushido.

References

External links 
 Hellish Quart on Steam

2021 video games
Early access video games
Fighting games
Video games developed in Poland
Video games set in Poland
Video games set in the 17th century
Windows games
Windows-only games